Private Buckaroo is a 1942 American comedy-musical film directed by Edward F. Cline starring The Andrews Sisters, Dick Foran, Harry James, Shemp Howard, Joe E. Lewis, and Jennifer Holt. The film tells the story of army recruits following basic training, with the Andrews Sisters attending USO dances.

Plot
Entertainer Lon Prentice initially is keen to enlist in the US Army but is prevented from this due to his having one flat foot. After having the flat fixed, he is accepted for enlistment. Soon after basic training begins, Private Prentice informs his commanding officer that he finds most military training useless, unnecessary and beneath him. His commander orders all the men that Private Prentice is exempt from doing things he doesn't want to do, which turns the entire camp against him.

Cast
 The Andrews Sisters (Maxene Andrews, Patty Andrews and Laverne Andrews)
 Dick Foran as Lon Prentice
 Joe E. Lewis as Lancelot Pringle McBiff
 Jennifer Holt as Joyce Mason
 Shemp Howard as First Sgt. 'Muggsy' Shavel
 Richard Davies as Lt. Howard Mason
 Mary Wickes as Bonnie-Belle Schlopkiss
 Ernest Truex as Col. Elias Weatherford
 Donald O'Connor as Donny
 Peggy Ryan as Peggy
 Huntz Hall as Cpl. Anemic
 Susan Levine as Tagalong
 Jivin' Jacks and Jills as Themselves 
 Harry James and His Music Makers as Themselves

Soundtrack
Dick Foran - "Private Buckaroo" (written by Charles Newman and Allie Wrubel)
The Andrews Sisters - "Three Little Sisters" (written by Irving Taylor and Vic Mizzy)
Dick Foran - "I'm in the Army Now"
The Andrews Sisters - "Six Jerks in a Jeep" (written by Sid Robin)
The Andrews Sisters - "Don't Sit Under the Apple Tree" (written by Sam H. Stept and Charles Tobias)
The Andrews Sisters - "James Session" danced by Donald O'Connor, Peggy Ryan and The Jivin' Jacks and Jills
The Andrews Sisters - "Steppin' Out Tonight", based on the song "That's The Moon, My Son" (written by Art Kassel and Sammy Gallop)
Dick Foran and Helen Forrest - "Nobody Knows the Trouble I've Seen"
Harry James and His Music Makers - "Concerto for Trumpet"
The Andrews Sisters - "Johnny Get Your Gun Again" (written by Don Raye and Gene de Paul)
Dick Foran and The Andrews Sisters - "We've Got a Job to Do" (written by Vickie Knight)
Joe E. Lewis - "I Love the South"
Helen Forrest with Harry James and His Music Makers - "You Made Me Love You" (written by Joseph McCarthy and James V. Monaco)

See also
 Public domain film
 List of American films of 1942
 List of films in the public domain in the United States

References

External links

1942 films
1942 musical comedy films
American musical comedy films
World War II films made in wartime
American black-and-white films
Universal Pictures films
Films directed by Edward F. Cline
Military humor in film
1940s English-language films